Peperomia eburnea is a species of plant in the genus Peperomia native to Colombia and Ecuador. It has a creeping or trailing growth habit, and grows in wet tropical biomes. Its foliage is green, and often has a single white stripe, along with red spotted backs of the leaves. Sodiro, who collected the type specimen for this species, described the red-mottled variant as maculata, but this variety is not scientifically accepted.

References 

eburnea
Plants described in 1871
Flora of Colombia
Flora of Ecuador